Santiago Ramos (born 1 August 1949) is a Spanish actor. He won the Goya Award for Best Actor for his performance in Como un relámpago (1996).

He became popular to a wide television audience for his performance as Andrés Guerra in Aquí no hay quien viva from 2004 to 2006.

Biography 
He was raised in San Muñoz, province of Salamanca. He dropped out from a licentiate degree in law in order to pursue an acting career. He made his feature film debut in the 1973 thriller . He had a son with actress Gloria Muñoz.

After ensuing appearances in Cabo de vara and Tierra de rastrojos, his film career consolidated with a co-starring role in The Heifer (1985). His won the Goya Award for Best Actor for his performance in the 1996 film Como un relámpago.

Despite having a seasoned film career prior to that point, he rather achieved popularity in Spain for his performance as Andrés Guerra in comedy television series Aquí no hay quien viva from 2004 to 2006. In July 2005, after a decade of relationship, he married makeup artist . After his 2013 appearance in comedy series  he primarily dedicated to theatre.

Filmography

Film

Television

Accolades

Informational notes

References 

1949 births
Living people
20th-century Spanish male actors
21st-century Spanish male actors
Spanish male stage actors
Spanish male television actors
Spanish male film actors
Male actors from Castile and León
People from the Province of Salamanca
Best Actor Goya Award winners